European Civil Liberties Network is a Europe-wide civil liberties advocacy group.

See also
 American Civil Liberties Union

External links

Organizations established in 2005
Civil liberties advocacy groups